Emily Nelson (born 10 November 1996) is a former English professional racing cyclist. Her sister, Josie, is also a cyclist and joined Trinity Racing for the 2021 season.

Career
On 8 August 2013, at the Sir Chris Hoy Velodrome in Glasgow, Nelson competed at the UCI Juniors Track World Championships. She was part of Britain's Team Pursuit squad which also included Hayley Jones, Amy Hill and Emily Kay. In the qualifying heat, they broke the senior world record which had only been set a few weeks previously at the European Track Championships, setting a new time of 4:38.708. In the final, they broke the record once more, with a time of 4:35.085, beating Russia to become world champions. 

On the road in 2017, Nelson won the third round of the Matrix Fitness Grand Prix Series in Northwich. Nelson followed this up by finishing second at the Lincoln Grand Prix which was part of the National Women's Road Series.

Major results

2013
 1st  Team pursuit, UCI Junior Track World Championships
2014
 1st  Team pursuit, UEC European Junior Track Championships
2015
Revolution
1st Scratch Race - Round 2 - Manchester
1st Scratch Race - Round 4 – Glasgow
2nd Scratch Race - Round 3, London
2016
 UCI Track World Cup
1st  Team pursuit (Glasgow)
2nd Team pursuit (Hong Kong)
3rd Points race
 UEC European Track Championships
2nd  Madison race (with Emily Kay)
3rd  Team pursuit
 UEC European Under–23 Track Championships
1st  Team pursuit
2nd  Points race
 Revolution
1st Points race - Round 2, Glasgow
2nd Points race - Round 6, Manchester
2nd Scratch race - Round 2, Glasgow
3rd Scratch race - Round 6, Manchester
 Revolution Champions League
1st Points race - Round 1, Manchester
2nd Omnium - Round 1, Manchester
2017
6 Giorni delle Rose - Fiorenzuola
1st Madison (with Katie Archibald)
2nd Points Race
2nd Scratch Race
National Track Championships
1st  Team pursuit
2nd Individual pursuit
2nd Points race
3rd Omnium
 2nd  Madison race, UCI Track World Championships (with Elinor Barker)
 UCI Track World Cup
2nd  Madison, Round 1, Pruszków (with Elinor Barker)
3rd  Team Pursuit, Round 1, Pruszków (with Neah Evans, Emily Kay and Manon Lloyd)
 3rd Overall Six Days of London
1st Madison (with Neah Evans)
3rd Scratch Race
 3rd Points Race, Revolution Series – Champions League – Round 2, Glasgow
2019
 UEC European Track Championships
1st  Scratch race
2nd  Elimination race

References

External links
 
 
 

1996 births
Living people
English female cyclists
British track cyclists
UCI Track Cycling World Champions (women)
Sportspeople from Burton upon Trent
Commonwealth Games competitors for England
Cyclists at the 2018 Commonwealth Games